Vesperae solennes de Dominica, K. 321, is a sacred choral composition, written by Wolfgang Amadeus Mozart in 1779. It is scored for SATB choir and soloists, violin I and II, 2 trumpets, 3 trombones colla parte, 2 timpani, and basso continuo (bassoon and organ).

It was composed in Salzburg at the request of the Archbishop Colloredo for liturgical use in the city's cathedral. The title "de Dominica" signifies its use in Sunday services. In 1780, Mozart composed another setting of Solemn Vespers, the Vesperae solennes de confessore, which shares many musical similarities with this work.

Structure 
The setting is divided into six movements, including five psalms and a setting of the Magnificat. A setting of the Minor Doxology (Gloria Patri) concludes all movements, each recapitulating the opening theme. The first three psalms are scored in a vigorous, exuberant manner, contrasting with the strict counterpoint of the a cappella Laudate pueri. The Laudate Dominum is set as an extended aria for the soprano soloist with obbligato organ, while the Magnificat opens with a majestic, moderate tempo, only to return to the bolder tempo of the first three psalms.

 Dixit Allegro vivace, C major, 
 Confitebor Allegro, E minor, 
 Beatus vir Allegro, B major, 
 Laudate pueri F major, 
 Laudate Dominum Allegro, A major, 
 Magnificat Adagio maestoso, C major, 
 "Et exultavit" Allegro, C major,

References

External links 
 
 
 
 

Compositions by Wolfgang Amadeus Mozart
1779 compositions
Choral compositions
Psalm settings
Magnificat settings
Vespers settings